Giuseppe Puricelli (1825 in Gallarate, Lombardy – 1894 in Casirate d'Adda)  was an Italian painter, in oil and watercolor, mainly of landscapes and outdoor and countryside genre scenes.

He was a resident of Milan much of his life. At 1872 in Milan, he Cascinale and a canvas of a Girl at Work.  In 1877 at the Exposition of Naples, he displayed Water and Bread; in 1880 at Turin, Va il pensiero come l'altalena; and in 1881 at Milan, he displayed Una stalla and Alla memoria del figlio. Puricelli also painted portraits.

References

1825 births
1895 deaths
Painters from Milan
Italian genre painters
19th-century Italian painters
Italian male painters
19th-century Italian male artists